Faulty Inner Dialogue is the third studio album by Scottish alternative rock band Kid Canaveral, released on 29 July 2016 by Scottish independent label Lost Map Records.

Track listing
All songs written by David MacGregor, except where noted.

"Gun Fhaireachdain" - 2:57
"First We Take Dumbarton" - 3:48
"Tragic Satellite" - 3:15
"Ten Milligrams" - 1:15
"Callous Parting Gift" (Kate Lazda) - 3:04
"Pale White Flower" - 3:42
"Lifelong Crisis of Confidence" - 3:41
"Listen to Me" (Lazda) - 4:22
"From Your Bright Room" - 3:56
"Twenty Milligrams" - 1:23
"Lives Never Lived - 4:41
"Reel" - 4:43

Personnel
Kid Canaveral
 David MacGregor – vocals, guitar, keyboards, percussion, programming, field recordings 
 Kate Lazda – vocals, guitar, keyboards
 Rose McConnachire – bass, vocals, keyboards
 Scott McMaster – drums, percussion
 Michael Craig - keyboards

Additional personnel
 Gal – engineer, mixing, producer
 Reuben Taylor – mastering

References

2016 albums
Kid Canaveral albums